The Pu Tian Yue is considered the first national anthem of China, though it was not approved officially by the Qing dynasty's government.

History
In 1878, (the 4th year of Guangxu), Zeng Jize (曾纪泽) had a diplomatic visit to Great Britain and France; he was appointed Ambassador to Russia two years later. At an international convention, a national song was needed, so he wrote the song Pu Tian Yue to the tune 词牌.

This song was not officially approved by the Qing dynasty, but is widely recognized as the National Song of China in other countries.

The only known versions are from a version played by the Victor Military Band, translated as "The World's Delight," recorded in Camden, New Jersey on 9/18/1914.

Lyrics
The lyrics seem to have disappeared, although the YouTuber "Ying Yang Mapper" managed to find a fraction of the song:

Simplified Chinese
一统旧江山，
亚细亚文明古国四千年，
最可叹：，
犹太、印度与波兰，
亡国恨，
谈之心寒……

Traditional Chinese
一统舊江山，
亞細亞文明古國四千年，
最可嘆：，
猶太、印度與波蘭，
亡國恨，
談之心寒……

Hanyu Pinyin
Yītǒng jiù jiāngshān, 
Yàxìyà wénmíng gǔguó sìqiān nián! 
Zuì kě tàn: 
Yóutài, yìndù yǔ bōlán, 
Wángguó hèn, 
Tán zhī xīnhán……

English
One Old United Nation, 
4,000 Years of Civilized Asia, 
Sadly: 
Judea, India, and Poland, 
National subjugation,
It is chilling to discuss

References

Political party songs
Historical national anthems
Chinese patriotic songs
Asian anthems

zh:中国国歌